The Portuguese Court of Audits is the high-court in Portugal responsible for reviewing the legal issues on public expenditure and delivering judgement on those accounts relating to:
 General Accounts of the State
 accounts of the Autonomous Regions of the Azores and of Madeira
 liability of financial offences

See also
Judiciary of Portugal
Constitution of Portugal

References

External links

Auditors
Politics of Portugal
Portugal
Supreme audit institutions
Courts and tribunals with year of establishment missing